The Hatakaze class of guided-missile destroyers is a third generation class of vessels in service with the Japan Maritime Self-Defense Force (JMSDF). They were the first of the JMSDF's ships to have gas-turbine propulsion.

The core weapon suite is similar to that of the preceding , but various improvements were made in many areas. Most notable are those that allow the Hatakaze class to function as a group flagship. Normally this duty resides with a larger type of ship, but in case of their absence due to repairs, accident, or battle damage, the Hatakaze design allows for it to function as a command ship.

Hatakaze destroyers operate the OYQ-4-1 type tactical control system. Its weapon systems include the Standard missile surface-to-air missile, anti-submarine rockets, the RGM-84 Harpoon anti-ship missile, two Mark 15 20 mm CIWS gun mounts, two torpedo mounts in a triple tube configuration and two 5 inch/54 caliber Mark 42 rapid-fire guns.

Ships in the class

See also
 List of naval ship classes in service

References

External links

 GlobalSecurity.org; JMSDF DDG Hatakaze Class

 
Destroyer classes
Ships built by Mitsubishi Heavy Industries